Bądki may refer to:
Bądki, Pomeranian Voivodeship, Poland
Bądki, Warmian-Masurian Voivodeship, Poland